The Evert–Mandlíková rivalry was a tennis rivalry between Chris Evert and Hana Mandlíková, who met 26 times during their careers. Evert leads their head-to-head 19–7. In 1981 the rivalry was described as the most "dramatic" in women's tennis.

Head-to-head

Evert–Mandlikova (19–7)

Head-to-head breakdown
 All finals: Evert 5–1
 Grand Slam matches: Evert 10–3
 Grand Slam finals: Evert 3–0
 Grand Slam semifinals: Tied 3–3
 Non-Grand Slam finals: Evert 2–1
 Three-set matches: Evert 6–2

See also
List of tennis rivalries

References

External links

 WTA.com  the source of this rivalry

Chris Evert
Tennis rivalries
Sports rivalries in the United States